Catocala uljanae is a moth in the family Erebidae. It is found in China (Sichuan).

References

uljanae
Moths described in 2007
Moths of Asia